Peterson Gymnasium (or Peterson Gym) is a 3,668 seat multi-purpose arena in San Diego, California on the campus of San Diego State University (SDSU). The gym opened in 1961 and currently serves as the home of the San Diego State Aztecs women's volleyball team. The facility is named after Charles E. Peterson, who during his 37-year career at San Diego State University served as athletic director, football coach, track coach, basketball coach, Dean of Men and alumni executive secretary. 

Peterson Gym has been home to several San Diego State Aztecs varsity sports teams over the years, including the now-defunct men's volleyball team (discontinued in 2000), which won San Diego State's first (and-to-date only) NCAA Division I national championship in any sport, at the 1973 NCAA men's volleyball tournament (which was hosted by SDSU and played at Peterson Gym). The men's and women's basketball teams also played at Peterson Gym until moving across the street to Cox Arena (now known as the Viejas Arena) upon its opening in 1997. 

In 1972–73, Peterson Gym was home of the American Basketball Association (ABA)'s San Diego Conquistadors. The Conquistadors were coached by Naismith Basketball Hall of Fame inductee and Boston Celtics great K.C. Jones. The team finished with a 30–54 record. Following the season, the team switched its home arena to the San Diego Sports Arena.

Today, Peterson Gym also contains some classrooms for lectures.

References

External links
 SDSU Athletics Facilities

Defunct college basketball venues in the United States
Basketball venues in California
Sports venues in San Diego
San Diego State Aztecs basketball venues
San Diego State Aztecs volleyball
College volleyball venues in the United States
American Basketball Association venues
Volleyball venues in California
College basketball venues in the United States
1961 establishments in California
Sports venues completed in 1961